Israel Roll (1937 - June 2010) was an Israeli archaeologist and academic.

Archaeology career
Israel Roll was the director of the Apollonia-Arsuf excavations and one of the directors of the Roman Temple dig at Kedesh.  He completed his bachelor's degree at the Hebrew University in Jerusalem. His Ph.D. thesis on the cult of Mithras is from the Sorbonne.

Roll was a leading authority on classical archaeology, specializing in the Roman road system in Judea and the adjacent provinces. The Roman Road Survey was directed and published by Roll,  Benjamin Isaac and Moshe Fischer. The first publication describes the Legio - Scythopolis road. The second publication, describing the Jaffa- Jerusalem roads, was published in 1996.

Published works
 Isaac B.H. and Roll, I. 1976. A Milestone of AD 69 from Judaea. Journal of Roman Studies 56. pp. 9–14.
 Roll, I. 1978. The mysteries of Mithras in the Roman Orient: the problem of origin. Journal of Mithraic Studies Volume II.
 Isaac B.H. and Roll, I. 1979. Legio II Traiana in Judaea. ZPE 33. pp. 149–156
 Roll, I. and Tal, O. Apollonia - Arsuf Final Reports I. Tel aviv.
 Isaac, B.H. and Roll, I. 1982. Roman Roads in Judaea, I, The Scythopolis-Legio Road, Oxford, B.A.R. International Series.
 Roll, I. 1983. The Roman Road System in Judaea. The Jerusalem Cathedra.
 Fischer, L. M. Isaac, B. H. and Roll, I. 1996. Roman Roads in Judaea, II, The Jaffa - Jerusalem Roads. B.A.R. International Series, Oxford.

References

External links
 Moshe Fischer and Oren Tal, IN MEMORIAM: Israel Roll, (1937–2010), Tel Aviv 37 (2010), 139–140

Israeli archaeologists
Hebrew University of Jerusalem alumni
University of Paris alumni
Academic staff of Tel Aviv University
1937 births
2010 deaths